Samuel Scheimann (born 3 November 1987) is an Israeli formerinternational footballer who played as a left back for Feyenoord, NAC Breda, Kozakken Boys, FC Den Bosch, SBV Excelsior, Maccabi Haifa, Hapoel Haifa, Hapoel Tel Aviv and Beitar Jerusalem.

Early life
Samuel Scheimann was born in Afula, Israel, to a Jewish family. He immigrated to the Netherlands with his family at the age of five.

Club career
Scheimann started playing football in the youth system of Feyenoord. In 2003, Scheimann joined the youth system of NAC Breda. 

At age 18, he represented the Netherlands at the 2005 Maccabiah Games in football. Shortly thereafter, Scheimann was invited by Maccabi Tel Aviv for trials  but did not receive a contract. Scheimann returned to the Netherlands and signed a two-year contract with Kozakken Boys. After an extensive trial at Jong AFC Ajax, coach Aron Winter wanted to sign Scheimann in 2008, but Martin van Geel vetoed the signing. On 11 April 2008, he signed with FC Den Bosch from Kozakken Boys after rejecting an offer from Feyenoord because he wanted first team action. Scheimann was voted 'Player of the Year' in his first season with Den Bosch.

After the 2010–11 Eerste Divisie season ended, Scheimann left Den Bosch as a free agent. He joined Eredivisie club Excelsior Rotterdam on a two-year contract until July 2013.

Scheimann made his debut for Excelsior in a 2–0 loss against Feyenoord on 5 August 2011, playing 90 minutes.

On 3 June 2012, he signed to Maccabi Haifa for two years, with an option for two more years. On 27 August 2012, he made his Israeli Premier League debut in a 1–2 loss against Maccabi Tel Aviv.

On 2 June 2015, he signed to Hapoel Tel Aviv for two years. In January 2017 he was released by Hapoel, following financial problems.

On 12 January 2017, he signed to Hapoel Haifa for 1.5 years.

On 11 June 2018, he signed to Hapoel Be'er Sheva for two years.

On 5 September 2018, Scheimann released from Be'er Sheva and signed to Beitar Jerusalem for two years.

In June 2019 he returned to the Netherlands with VVV-Venlo.

In January 2020 he signed for the Israeli team Hapoel Ironi Kiryat Shmona F.C. After playing 7 games in the team, he was released from contract in the end of the season.

In August 2020 he signed in the Dutch team VV Katwijk of the Tweede Divisie for a free transfer.

International career
On 16 May 2012, Scheimann received his first call up to the Israeli national team. He made his international debut later that year.

References

External links
 Player profile at Voetbal International 
 Player statistics at ElfVoetbal.nl 
 Samuel Scheimann Interview

1987 births
Living people
Israeli Jews
Dutch Jews
Jewish Dutch sportspeople
Israeli footballers
Dutch footballers
Kozakken Boys players
FC Den Bosch players
Excelsior Rotterdam players
Maccabi Haifa F.C. players
Hapoel Tel Aviv F.C. players
Hapoel Haifa F.C. players
Hapoel Be'er Sheva F.C. players
Beitar Jerusalem F.C. players
VVV-Venlo players
Hapoel Ironi Kiryat Shmona F.C. players
VV Katwijk players
Eredivisie players
Eerste Divisie players
Israeli Premier League players
Israel international footballers
Dutch people of Israeli descent
Footballers from Afula
Maccabiah Games footballers
Maccabiah Games competitors for the Netherlands
Competitors at the 2005 Maccabiah Games
Israeli expatriate sportspeople in the Netherlands
Association football fullbacks